Armadale Castle is a ruined country house in Armadale, Skye, former home of the MacDonalds. A mansion house was first built here around 1790, facing south-east over the Sound of Sleat. In 1815 a square Tudor-Gothic mock-castle, intended for show rather than defence, designed by Edinburgh architect James Gillespie Graham, was built next to the house.

After 1855 the part of the house destroyed by fire was replaced by a central wing, designed by David Bryce. Since 1925 the castle, abandoned by the Macdonald family, has fallen into ruin. The gardens around the castle have been maintained, and are now home to the Clan Donald Centre, which operates the Museum of the Isles.

All the southern (Gillespie-Graham) sections of the building were demolished in 1971, leaving the (roofless) David Bryce section and a less formal two storey wing on the far north side. The remnant section is only listed category C due to its ruinous condition. The gardens are protected as a Designed Landscape.

References

External links
 
Clan Donald Centre at Armadale Castle 
Gazetteer for Scotland: Armadale Castle

Castles in the Isle of Skye
Category B listed buildings in Highland (council area)
Clan Donald
Houses in Highland (council area)
Inventory of Gardens and Designed Landscapes
Listed castles in Scotland
James Gillespie Graham buildings
Museums in Highland (council area)
Gardens in Highland (council area)
Ethnic museums in Scotland